Nat is a given name (usually masculine), nickname and surname. 

It is a nickname for Nathan, Nathaniel, Natalie, or Natalia.

It may refer to the following people:

Given name or nickname
 Nat Adderley (1931–2000), American jazz cornet and trumpet player
 Nat Adderley, Jr. (born 1955), American pop and rhythm and blues music arranger and pianist, son of the above
 Nat Ayer (1887–1952), American composer, pianist, singer and actor
 Nat Bailey (1902-1978), American-born Canadian restaurateur
 Nat Bentham, English professional rugby league footballer
 Nat Brown (born 1981), English footballer
 Nathaniel Burbank (1838–1901), American humorist, drama critic, and newspaper editor
 Nat King Cole (1919-1965), American singer and jazz pianist
 Nat Cook, Australian politician
 Nat Exon (born 1992), Australian rules footballer
 Nat Faxon (born 1975), American actor, comedian and Academy Award-winning screenwriter
 Nat Fyfe (born 1991), Australian rules footballer
 Nat Gonella (1908–1998), English jazz trumpeter, bandleader, vocalist and mellophonist
 Nat Grider (born 2000), Australian rules footballer
 Nat Hentoff (born 1925), American historian, novelist, jazz and country music critic and syndicated columnist
 Nat Hickey (1902–1979), American basketball and minor league baseball player and coach
 Nat Hiken (1914–1968), American radio and television writer, producer and songwriter
 Nat Holman (1896-1995), American early professional basketball player and innovator, member of the Basketball Hall of Fame
 Nat Lofthouse (1925-2011), English footballer
 Nat Love (1854-1921), African-American cowboy and former slave
 Nat Mauldin, American screenwriter, television writer and film producer
 Nat Militzok (1923–2009), American basketball player who played in the first National Basketball Association game
 Nat Moore (born 1951), American retired National Football League player
 Nat Pendleton (1895-1967), American actor and Olympic wrestler
 Nat Perrin (1905–1998), American comedy writer
 Nat Pierce (1925-1992), American jazz pianist, composer and arranger
 Nat Quansah, botanist from Ghana
 Nat Rogers (1893-?), baseball player in the Negro leagues
 Nat Shapiro (1922-1983), American jazz writer and record producer
 Nat Mayer Shapiro (1919-2005), American visual artist
 Nat Simon (1900–1979), American composer, pianist, bandleader and songwriter
 Nat Stuckey (1933-1988), American country music singer
 Nat Towles (1905–1963), African-American musician and jazz and big band leader
 Nat Turner (1800-1831), African-American slave who led a rebellion of slaves and free blacks
 Nat Walton (1866–1930), English international footballer
 Nat's What I Reckon, an Australian YouTuber
 Nat Wolff (born 1994), American actor and lead singer for the TV series The Naked Brothers Band
 Nat Young (born 1947), Australian surfer and author

Surname
 Marie-José Nat (born 1940), French film and television actress
 Yves Nat (1890–1956), French pianist and composer

See also
 Nate (given name)

Lists of people by nickname
Hypocorisms